The 2002 Mid-American Conference baseball tournament took place in May 2002. The top six regular season finishers met in the double-elimination tournament held at Warren E. Steller Field on the campus of Bowling Green State University in Bowling Green, Ohio. This was the fourteenth Mid-American Conference postseason tournament to determine a champion. Third seed  won their second consecutive and fourth overall tournament championship to earn the conference's automatic bid to the 2002 NCAA Division I baseball tournament.

Seeding and format 
The winner of each division claimed the top two seeds, while the next four finishers based on conference winning percentage only, regardless of division, participated in the tournament. The teams played double-elimination tournament. This was the fifth year of the six team tournament.

Results

All-Tournament Team 
The following players were named to the All-Tournament Team.

Most Valuable Player 
Brad Snyder won the Tournament Most Valuable Player award. Snyder played for Ball State.

References 

Tournament
Mid-American Conference Baseball Tournament
Mid-American Conference baseball tournament
Mid-American Conference baseball tournament